Sambucus lanceolata is a species of elderberry endemic to Madeira Island in the eastern Atlantic Ocean. The common name in English is Madeira elder.

Sambucus lanceolata Banks ex Lowe, Trans. Cambridge Philos. Soc. 4: 31 1831.

References

lanceolata
Flora of Madeira
Endemic flora of Madeira
Plants described in 1831